
Yanggarriny Wunungmurra (1932–2003) was an artist, yidaki player and leader of the Dhalwangu clan of the Yolngu people of northeast Arnhem Land in the Northern Territory of Australia.

Career
In 1963 he was one of the major contributors to the Yirritja side of the Yirrkala Church Panels. Considered one of the seminal figures in the Yolngu bark painting movement, Wunungmurra's work is included in most major collections of Aboriginal Australian art.

Wunungmurra was also a celebrated yidaki player. Alan Brissenden and Keith Glennon describe him as "a meticulous, and complete, artist, not only a virtuoso of the didgeridoo, but also a fine singer, dancer and bark painter".

In 1997, Wunungmurra's work Gangan was awarded first prize in the National Aboriginal and Torres Strait Islander Art Award.

Yanggarriny Wunungmurra v. Peter Stripes Fabrics 
In 1983, Wunungmurra was the first Aboriginal artist to have his copyright recognised in an Australian court. The case, Yanggarriny Wunungmurra v. Peter Stripes Fabrics was won against the Australian Copyright Act 1968, which had previously not considered Aboriginal Australian designs to be "original" and thereby protected under copyright in Australia.

In 1981, Wunungmurra took Peter Stripes Fabrics to the Australian Federal Court for unauthorised use of his painting, Long-necked Freshwater Tortoises by the Fish Trap at Gaanan (1975). The case hinged on whether the painting constituted "traditional designs" or whether it constituted the original work of the artist. In his statement to the court, Yanggarriny noted that he had learned the design from Gawirrin Gumana's father (Birrikitji Gumana) and that both men had the authority to paint the design. However, he also maintained that anyone could tell that the painting was his by the way the tortoise was drawn, which was like his signature. Elizabeth Burns Coleman argues that "the case was won by the stress that was placed on Wunungmurra's additions to and differences from traditional design... As such, the argument emphasized what was original in his work, rather than what was traditional".

Collections 

Art Gallery of New South Wales
Art Gallery of South Australia
The British Museum
Museum and Art Gallery of the Northern Territory
National Gallery of Victoria
National Museum of Australia

Significant exhibitions 

 1995: Miny'tji Buku-Larrnggay: Paintings from the East. National Gallery of Victoria, Melbourne.
 1999-2001: Saltwater: Yirrkala Bark Paintings of Sea Country. Drill Hall Gallery, Australian National University, Canberra; John Curtin Gallery, Curtin University, Perth; Australian National Maritime Museum, Sydney; Museum of Modern Art Heide; Melbourne; Araluen Art Centre, Alice Springs.

Family

Yanggarriny's son, Nawurapu Wunungmurra, is an artist, whose work is on display in the Art Gallery of South Australia in Adelaide.

References

Australian Aboriginal artists
2003 deaths
1932 births